Rostislav Rurikovich (1173 - before 1214), Prince of Torchesk (1195–1205), Grand Prince of Kiev (Kyiv, 1204–1206), Prince of Vyshhorod (1205–1210), Prince of Halych (1207).  Son of Rurik Rostislavich and Anna of Turov.

References

1173 births
13th-century deaths
Grand Princes of Kiev
Princes of Halych
13th-century princes in Kievan Rus'
Eastern Orthodox monarchs
Rostislavichi family (Smolensk)